The Guadalupe County Correctional Facility is a privately owned medium-security state prison for men located in Santa Rosa, Guadalupe County, New Mexico, owned by the Correctional Properties Trust and operated by the GEO Group.

The facility has a capacity of 600 inmates.

References

Prisons in New Mexico
Buildings and structures in Guadalupe County, New Mexico
GEO Group
1999 establishments in New Mexico